Richard Lee Murphy (born September 18, 1986) is a former American football running back. He was signed by the Jacksonville Jaguars as an undrafted free agent in 2011. He played college football at Louisiana State.
As a senior at LSU, Murphy was chosen by the coaching staff to wear the No. 18 jersey, which signifies the player who displays the best leadership qualities. Only a "part-time player" over his career at LSU, Murphy was seen as a development prospect, and went undrafted in the 2011 NFL Draft. Murphy was released by the Jaguars on August 31, 2012. He was signed to the team's practice squad on October 31.

Murphy was released by the Jaguars on May 6, 2013.

References

External links
 Jacksonville Jaguars bio

1986 births
Living people
American football running backs
Louisiana State University alumni
LSU Tigers football players
Jacksonville Jaguars players
People from Monroe, Louisiana
Players of American football from Louisiana